Martin John Thursfield (born 14 December 1971 in South Shields, County Durham) is a former English cricketer. Thursfield was a right-handed batsman and a right-arm medium pace bowler.

Thursfield signed for his first club Middlesex in 1990, making his first-class debut against the New Zealanders. Thursfield was released by Middlesex at the end of the 1990 season. In January 1991 Thursfield played a Youth One Day International for England, which was to be his only international match.

Thursfield signed for Hampshire in 1992, making his first-class debut for the county against Oxford University. During this season Thursfield also made his List-A debut against Nottinghamshire. Thursfield would spend five seasons at Hampshire, playing twenty first-class matches and 31 one-day matches for the club. At the end of the 1996 season Thursfield left Hampshire after failing to make an impact at the club in his final seasons.

Thursfield signed a one-year deal for Sussex in 1997. Thursfield played just two first-class and one-day games for Sussex before he was released just three months into his one-year contract. Thursfield returned to his roots in County Durham where he continued to play club cricket.

External links
Martin Thursfield on Cricinfo
Martin Thursfield on CricketArchive
Matches and detailed statistics for Martin Thursfield on CricketArchive

1971 births
Living people
Cricketers from South Shields
Cricketers from County Durham
English cricketers
Middlesex cricketers
Hampshire cricketers
Sussex cricketers
Hampshire Cricket Board cricketers